Edige is a rural locality (a selo) in Nogaysky District, Republic of Dagestan, Russia. The population was 587 as of 2010. There are 7 streets.

Geography 
Edige is located 48 km southeast of Terekli-Mekteb (the district's administrative centre) by road. Tarumovka and Komsomolsky are the nearest rural localities.

Nationalities 
Nogais live there.

References 

Rural localities in Nogaysky District, Dagestan